is the first opening theme song of the Dragon Ball Z anime series and the fifteenth single by Japanese singer Hironobu Kageyama. It was released on vinyl, cassette, and mini CD on May 1, 1989. It is coupled with the first Dragon Ball Z closing theme  performed by Manna.

The song opened for the first 199 episodes of the TV series and the first nine movies of the film series. It has been re-recorded in many other languages with an English version performed by Kageyama himself that was released on his third greatest hits album entitled Hironobu Kageyama Best Album 3: Mixture in 1996. The single sold 1.3million copies in Japan.

Development
Kageyama had been reading the Dragon Ball manga in Weekly Shōnen Jump for quite some time when he was offered the job to record the song. He stated that he was shocked when the offer came up. Kageyama considers the song to be his best work as people are always happy when he sings it.

Track listing

2005 Recording

In 2005 Kageyama was called back to record a new version of "Cha-La Head-Cha-La" called "Cha-La Head-Cha-La (2005 Ver.)". This version features a completely different composition. The release is coupled with a re-recording of "We Gotta Power" called "We Gotta Power (2005 Ver.)" which Kageyama performed as well. A "Self Cover" version featuring Kageyama on cover was also released as an iTunes exclusive; however, it omits one track mislabelled as "Cha-La Head-Cha-La (2005 ver. Instrumental)", however, this version lacks the "mobi[le-re]make version". The 2005 recording would go on to serve as the theme song for Japanese release of the video game Super Dragon Ball Z four months later. This version would peak at number 118 on Oricon.

Track listing
 Cha-La Head-Cha-La (2005 ver.)
 We Gotta Power (2005 ver.)
 Cha-La Head-Cha-La (DJ Dr.Knob Remix)
 We Gotta Power (Yuki Nakano Remix)
 Cha-La Head-Cha-La (mobi[le-re]make version)
 Cha-La Head-Cha-La (2005 ver. Instrumental)
 We Gotta Power (2005 ver. Instrumental)
 Go Love Out (2005 ver. Instrumental)

Cover versions
Since its release, the song has been covered by many artists. In 2001, the Anipara Kids recorded a version for the album Club Ani para presents: Ani para Best & More. In 2004 the compilation album Anime Trance 2 features a version by Tora + R-SEQ. The 2005 Anime Speed compilation and the 2006 Speed Buyuden compilation feature a version by Lee Tairon.

The Italian band Highlord recorded a version that appears as a bonus track on the Japanese release of their album Instant Madness. The anime cover band Animetal recorded their take on "Cha-la Head-Cha-la". It first appeared on Animetal Marathon VII as part of the "Jump Into The Fire mini-Marathon" at the end of the disc. The Animetal version also appears on Animetal's 2006 "Decade of Bravehearts" Concert CD/DVD. In 2007 the compilation album Zakkuri! Paratech feature the song as part of a megamix performed by the 777BOYS. They would later team up with Pinpon and produce another version for J-Anime! Hyper Techno & Trance.

The anime adaptation of the yonkoma manga Lucky Star substitutes conventional ending theme-songs with parodies of famous anime songs, episode five of which was "Cha-La Head-Cha-La" sung by the lead character, Konata. This was done at the request of Aya Hirano, Konata's voice actress, who is said to be a great fan of Kageyama. The song was later released as a part of ending-song compilations CD for the show. In 2008 another version would be recorded by Black Steel on the compilation Hi-Speed Kirakira Jk. Visual kei rock band Screw covered the song for the cover album V-Rock Anime in 2012. Idol group Momoiro Clover Z included a cover of the song on their single "Z no Chikai", which is the theme song for the 2015 movie Dragon Ball Z: Resurrection 'F'.

Hero (Kibō no Uta) / Cha-La Head-Cha-La

 is the twentieth single by Japanese rock band Flow, released on March 20, 2013, as a double A-Side. It is a cover of the original opening theme song of Dragon Ball Z by Hironobu Kageyama and is used as the theme song for the theatrical film Dragon Ball Z: Battle of Gods. "Hero ~Kibō no Uta~" is used as an insert song for the same movie. English-language versions of both songs were used for international releases of the film, with the English version of "Cha-La Head-Cha-La" included on the single as a B-side. "Rising Dragon -DJ Dragon Remix-" is a remix of "Rising Dragon" from Flow's 2004 "Go" single. "Cha-La Head-Cha-La" was used in Dragon Ball Z: Battle of Z, and Dragon Ball Xenoverse, as well as part of the Anisong & BGM Music Pack in Dragon Ball FighterZ, Dragon Ball Xenoverse 2, and Super Dragon Ball Heroes: World Mission.

"Hero ~Kibō no Uta~ / Cha-La Head-Cha-La" single reached #24 on the Oricon charts and charted for 5 weeks.

See also
 Shangri La

References

External links
 "Kageyama Complete!" listing 1989 version 
 Team Entertainment page 2005 version 

1989 songs
1989 singles
2005 singles
Dragon Ball songs
Nippon Columbia singles
Sony Music Entertainment Japan singles
Japanese film songs
Songs written for animated films
Songs written by Yukinojo Mori
Animated series theme songs
Children's television theme songs